Lt. Gen. Asif Mumtaz Sukhera was the Surgeon General of the Pakistan Army, and the Director General Medical Services (Inter Services) from July 18, 2016 to September 26, 2017.

References

Pakistani generals
Pakistani military doctors